Pratinidhi (The Representative) is a 1965 Bengali film directed by noted Indian art film director Mrinal Sen. The Black & White film was based on Prachhadpat (The Cover), a novel by Achintya Kumar Sengupta, a noted writer of Modern Bengali literature.

Plot
A young engineer Niren marries a young widow Rama who already has a five-year-old child Tutul from her previous marriage. Their marital life grows increasingly difficult as Tutul refuses to recognise his stepfather. Niren's attempts to win him over too fail even as Rama tries to please both. The marriage finally collapses and she commits suicide.

Cast
 Soumitra Chatterjee | Niren
 Sabitri Chatterjee | Rama
 Satya Bannerjee 
 Jahar Roy
 Anup Kumar | Rama's brother

References

External links

Mrinal Sen's website
British Film Institute
MRINAL SEN-60 Years In Search Of Cinema, a book  by Dipankar Mukhopadhyay

1964 films
Bengali-language Indian films
Films scored by Hemant Kumar
Films directed by Mrinal Sen
1960s Bengali-language films